Samuel McDonald Martin (c.1803 – 22 September 1848) was a New Zealand land claimant, doctor, magistrate, journalist and writer. He was born in Kilmuir, Skye, Scotland in c.1803. He was opposed to the policies of Governor William Hobson. He died in British Guiana where he had been appointed a magistrate.

References

1810 births
1848 deaths
District Court of New Zealand judges
New Zealand journalists
Scottish emigrants to New Zealand
19th-century journalists
Male journalists
People from the Isle of Skye
19th-century male writers
Colony of New Zealand judges
British Guiana judges
Members of the New Zealand Legislative Council (1841–1853)